Daniel or Dan Roberts  may refer to:

Daniel Roberts (Royal Navy officer) (1789–1869)
Daniel Foley Roberts (1834–1889), Queensland (Australia) politician 
Dan Roberts (writer) (1912–1995), pseudonym of the Canadian writer W. E. D. Ross
Dan Roberts (announcer) (born c. 1955), American public address announcer
Dan Roberts (bassist) (born 1967), Canadian bassist
Daniel Roberts (playwright) (born 1969), American playwright, editor and educator
Daniel Roberts (fighter) (born 1980), American professional mixed martial arts fighter
Daniel "Monkey Man" Roberts (born c. 1980), founder and owner of Pirate Cat Radio
Dan Roberts (singer), American singer and songwriter
Daniel Roberts (soccer) (born 1989), English-American professional soccer player
Daniel Roberts (rugby union) (born 1992), South African professional rugby union player
Daniel Roberts (hurdler) (born 1997), American hurdler

See also
Danny Roberts (disambiguation)
Daniel Robert (fl. 1970s–2000s), American set decorator